LRAT may refer to:

 Lecithin retinol acyltransferase
 Phosphatidylcholine—retinol O-acyltransferase